Jesse Compher (born July 1, 1999) is an American ice hockey player for Wisconsin. She previously played college ice hockey for Boston University. She is also a member of the United States women's national ice hockey team. She represented the United States at the 2022 Winter Olympics.

Playing career
Compher began her collegiate career for the Boston University Terriers during the 2017–18 season. She made her debut for the Terriers on September 23, 2017, in a game against Merrimack. She recorded her first two collegiate goals on November 28, 2017, in a 6–4 victory over Brown. She finished the season with nine goals and 17 assists in 37 games for the Terriers, ranking third on the team in points. Her 17 assists ranked second in the league among rookies. Following an outstanding freshman season, she was named to the Hockey East All-Rookie Team.

During the 2018–19 season, she led Hockey East in scoring and ranked third in the NCAA, recording 17 goals and 44 assists in 37 games. Her 44 assists were a program record, and she became the second player in program history to surpass 60 points during a season. On December 8, 2018, she posted a career-high five points, including an NCAA-best four assists, in an 8–0 victory over RIT. She was subsequently named the Hockey East Player of the Week, and NCAA First Star of the Week. Compher was named the Hockey East Player of the Month for the month of December after leading the nation in points (11) and assists (8). Following an outstanding season, she was named a Hockey East First Team All-Star, a Second Team CCM/AHCA Hockey All-American and a top ten finalist for the Patty Kazmaier Award. On April 13, 2020, Compher was named team captain for the Terriers. During the 2020–21 season, she led the team in scoring, with seven goals and 11 points in eight games. Following the season, she was named a Hockey East Second Team All-Star.

On April 14, 2022, Compher announced she was transferring to Wisconsin for her final year of NCAA eligibility.

International play
Compher represented the United States at the 2016 and 2017 IIHF World Women's U18 Championships, where she won gold. On March 1, 2019, Compher was named to the roster for the United States women's national ice hockey team at the 2019 IIHF Women's World Championship, where she recorded one assist in six games and won a gold medal. On February 25, 2020, Compher was again named to the roster for the United States at the 2020 IIHF Women's World Championship, however, the tournament was cancelled due to the COVID-19 pandemic. On March 30, 2021, Compher was again named to the roster for the United States at the 2021 IIHF Women's World Championship. On January 1, 2022, Compher was named to Team USA's roster to represent the United States at the 2022 Winter Olympics.

Personal life
Compher's brother, J. T. Compher, is a professional ice hockey player in the National Hockey League (NHL).

Career statistics

Regular season and playoffs

International

Awards and honors

References

External links

1999 births
Living people
American women's ice hockey forwards
Boston University Terriers women's ice hockey players
Ice hockey players from Illinois
Ice hockey players at the 2022 Winter Olympics
Medalists at the 2022 Winter Olympics
Olympic silver medalists for the United States in ice hockey
Olympic ice hockey players of the United States
People from Northbrook, Illinois